The 2013–14 USC Upstate Spartans men's basketball team represented the University of South Carolina Upstate during the 2013–14 NCAA Division I men's basketball season. The Spartans, led by 12th year head coach Eddie Payne, played their home games at the G. B. Hodge Center and were members of the Atlantic Sun Conference. They finished the season 19–15, 11–7 in A-Sun play to finish in third place. They advanced to the semifinals of the Atlantic Sun tournament where they lost to Mercer. They were invited to the CollegeInsider.com Tournament where they lost in the first round to Towson.

Roster

Schedule

|-
!colspan=9 style="background:#085435; color:#FFFFFF;"| Regular season

|-
!colspan=9 style="background:#085435; color:#FFFFFF;"| Atlantic Sun tournament

|-
!colspan=9 style="background:#085435; color:#FFFFFF;"| CIT

References

USC Upstate Spartans men's basketball seasons
USC Upstate
USC Upstate
Charleston Southern Buc South Carolina
Charleston Southern Buc South Carolina